A Haunting in Venice is an upcoming American mystery film directed by Kenneth Branagh, based on Hallowe'en Party by Agatha Christie. The film is a sequel to Murder on the Orient Express (2017) and Death on the Nile (2022). Branagh reprises his role as Hercule Poirot, alongside Kyle Allen, Camille Cottin, Jamie Dornan, Tina Fey, Jude Hill, Kelly Reilly, and Michelle Yeoh.

A Haunting in Venice is scheduled to be released in the United States on September 15, 2023.

Premise
Hercule Poirot, now retired, must solve the murder of a guest at a séance he attended.

Cast
 Kenneth Branagh as Hercule Poirot
 Kyle Allen
 Camille Cottin
 Jamie Dornan
 Tina Fey
 Jude Hill
 Kelly Reilly
 Michelle Yeoh
 Emma Laird
 Riccardo Scamarcio
 Ali Khan

Production
20th Century Studios president Steve Asbell revealed in March 2022 that a script for a third Hercule Poirot film had been written by Michael Green, with Kenneth Branagh set to return as director and star. The film will see a lesser known Poirot story be the basis for the plot. The film was confirmed in October 2022, with Jamie Dornan, Tina Fey, Jude Hill, Kelly Reilly and Michelle Yeoh among the cast. Filming began on October 31, 2022, with production occurring between Pinewood Studios and Venice.

Release
The film will be released on September 15, 2023.

References

External links
 

20th Century Studios films
2020s English-language films
2020s mystery thriller films
American crime thriller films
American detective films
American mystery thriller films
American sequel films
Films based on British novels
Films based on crime novels
Films based on Hercule Poirot books
Films directed by Kenneth Branagh
Films set in Venice
Films shot at Pinewood Studios
Films shot in Venice
Films with screenplays by Michael Green (writer)
Murder mystery films
Scott Free Productions films
TSG Entertainment films
2020s American films